Teesta Low Dam - IV Hydropower Plant is a run-of-the-river hydroelectric station built on the Teesta River at Kalijhora, Kalimpong district, West Bengal.

Geography

Location
It is near Kalijhora, (see map alongside).

The project
The project consists of a 45 m high dam with 4 penstocks of 45 m length and 7 m diameter each. The surface power house with installed capacity of 160 MW houses 4 units of 40 MW capacity each designed to operate under the net rated head of 25.05 M and designed to generate 720 million units in a 90% dependable year with 95% machine availability. Unit I, II, III and IV were commissioned in the month of February, March, July and August 2016 respectively. The state of West Bengal is the sole beneficiary of this power station. With the construction of the project the area is also benefited by development infrastructure, education, medical facilities and employment avenues.

References 

Hydroelectric power stations in West Bengal
Run-of-the-river power stations
Energy infrastructure completed in 2016
2016 establishments in West Bengal